The National Priorities Project was founded by Greg Speeter in 1983 to help community groups understand and respond to federal budget cuts in Massachusetts communities.

Shocked by this report, the district’s Congressperson, Silvio Conte, became a strong supporter of more federal spending for community-based programs and came out against a “balanced budget amendment” that slashed the federal safety net.

Activities
NPP currently focuses on educating the public about the federal budget with their online tool, Federal Budget 101, and their published book, The People's Guide to the Federal Budget. Barbara Ehrenreich wrote the foreword for the book.

The organization also focuses on taxes, the national debt, and government transparency, as well as federal spending for the military, education, healthcare, and other social programs.

References

External links
 

Community organizing
Economic advocacy groups in the United States
Non-profit organizations based in Massachusetts
Organizations established in 1983